In physics, Larmor precession (named after Joseph Larmor) is the precession of the magnetic moment of an object about an external magnetic field. The phenomenon is conceptually similar to the precession of a tilted classical gyroscope in an external torque-exerting gravitational field.  Objects with a magnetic moment also have angular momentum and effective internal electric current proportional to their angular momentum; these include electrons, protons, other fermions, many atomic and nuclear systems, as well as classical macroscopic systems. The external magnetic field exerts a torque on the magnetic moment,

The angular momentum vector  precesses about the external field axis with an angular frequency known as the Larmor frequency,
, 

where  is the angular frequency, and
 is the magnitude of the applied magnetic field.
The g-factor is the unit-less proportionality factor relating the system's angular momentum to the intrinsic magnetic moment; in classical physics it is just 1.

In nuclear physics the g-factor of a given system includes the effect of the nucleon spins, their orbital angular momenta, and their couplings. Generally, the g-factors are very difficult to calculate for such many-body systems, but they have been measured to high precision for most nuclei. The Larmor frequency is important in NMR spectroscopy. The gyromagnetic ratios, which give the Larmor frequencies at a given magnetic field strength, have been measured and tabulated here.

Crucially, the Larmor frequency is independent of the polar angle between the applied magnetic field and the magnetic moment direction. This is what makes it a key concept in fields such as nuclear magnetic resonance (NMR) and electron paramagnetic resonance (EPR), since the precession rate does not depend on the spatial orientation of the spins.

Including Thomas precession
The above equation is the one that is used in most applications. However, a full treatment must include the effects of Thomas precession, yielding the equation (in CGS units) (The CGS units are used so that E has the same units as B):

where  is the relativistic Lorentz factor (not to be confused with the gyromagnetic ratio above). Notably, for the electron g is very close to 2 (2.002...), so if one sets g = 2, one arrives at

Bargmann–Michel–Telegdi equation
The spin precession of an electron in an external electromagnetic field is described by the Bargmann–Michel–Telegdi (BMT) equation 

Using equations of motion,

This term describes Fermi–Walker transport and leads to Thomas precession. The second term is associated with Larmor precession.

When electromagnetic fields are uniform in space or when gradient forces like  can be neglected, the particle's translational motion is described by

The BMT equation is then written as 

The Beam-Optical version of the Thomas-BMT, from the Quantum Theory of Charged-Particle Beam Optics, applicable in accelerator optics

Applications
A 1935 paper published by Lev Landau and Evgeny Lifshitz predicted the existence of ferromagnetic resonance of the Larmor precession, which was independently verified in experiments by J. H. E. Griffiths (UK) and E. K. Zavoiskij (USSR) in 1946.

Larmor precession is important in nuclear magnetic resonance, magnetic resonance imaging, electron paramagnetic resonance, and muon spin resonance. It is also important for the alignment of cosmic dust grains, which is a cause of the polarization of starlight.

To calculate the spin of a particle in a magnetic field, one must in general also take into account Thomas precession if the particle is moving.

Precession direction
The spin angular momentum of an electron precesses counter-clockwise about the direction of the magnetic field. An electron has a negative charge, so the direction of its magnetic moment is opposite to that of its spin.

See also
LARMOR neutron microscope
Precession
Rabi cycle
Nuclear magnetic resonance
Perturbed angular correlation
Mössbauer effect
Muon spin spectroscopy

Notes

External links
Georgia State University HyperPhysics page on Larmor Frequency
Larmor Frequency Calculator

Atomic physics
Electromagnetism
Nuclear magnetic resonance
Precession